The 1900 Isle of Wight by-election was held on 23 May 1900 after the resignation of the incumbent Conservative  Sir Richard Webster to become Master of the Rolls which meant accepting a peerage.  The seat was retained by the Conservative candidate John Seely.  The Liberal candidate, Godfrey Baring was the chairman of the Isle of Wight County Council and would become the Liberal MP in 1906.

References 

By-elections to the Parliament of the United Kingdom in Hampshire constituencies
May 1900 events
1900 in England
1900 elections in the United Kingdom
19th century in Hampshire
Politics of the Isle of Wight